The opening ceremony of the 2011 Asian Winter Games was held at the Astana Arena, in Astana, Kazakhstan. It began at 6:00 PM (UTC+06:00) on 30 January 2011 and lasted approximately three hours.

An estimated 30,000 were in attendance at the venue. There were an estimated 700 performers.

Guests
 Faisal bin Al Hussein - Prince of Jordan
 Mohammed bin Zayed Al Nahyan - Crown Prince of Abu Dhabi
 Ahmed Al-Fahad Al-Ahmed Al-Sabah - Current IOC member representing Kuwait and president of the Olympic Council of Asia
 Nursultan Nazarbayev - President of Kazakhstan
 Jacques Rogge -  President of the International Olympic Committee
 Roza Otunbayeva - President of Kyrgyzstan
 René Fasel - President of the International Ice Hockey Federation
 Imangali Tasmagambetov - Current mayor of Astana
 Alexander Zhukov - Deputy Prime Minister of Russia and President of the Russian Olympic Committee

Program

Opening section
A dramatised performance based on traditional Kazakh epic poems accompanied by a group of ethnic drummers, which was followed by a volley of red fireworks began the show.

National anthem
Members of the Kazakhstan army marched the Kazakh flag to the flagpost. The anthem was then sung by Azamat Zheltyrguzov while the flag was risen.

Parade of Nations
Countries paraded in English alphabetical order, with Kuwait marching second-to-last (due to their suspension by the IOC) and Kazakhstan marching last as the host nation.

Below is list of countries that are confirmed to compete and their national flagbearers during the ceremony.
All the countries were given warm receptions by the crowd, however a deafening welcoming roar was given to the home team.

Notes
 A few discrepancies occurred between the placards and announcers:
 North and South Korea's placards bore their common names Солтүстік Корея ("North Korea") and Оңтүстік Корея ("South Korea") in Kazakh, and the abbreviations "DPR Korea" and "R.O. Korea" in English, though the Kazakh and English announcers both called out the full names "Democratic People's Republic of Korea" (Корей Халық Демократиялық Республикасы) and "Republic of Korea" (Корея Республикасы).
 Hong Kong's placard bore the name "Hong Kong, China", though the announcers called out the name "Hong Kong" (in both languages).
 Kyrgyzstan's placard bore the full name Қырғыз Республикасы ("Kyrgyz Republic") in Kazakh, though the English portion of the placard and both announcers used "Kyrgyzstan" (Қырғызстан).
 Similarly, host Kazakhstan's placard bore the full name Қазақстан Республикасы ("Republic of Kazakhstan") in Kazakh, though the English placard portion and both announcers used "Kazakhstan" (Қазақстан).
 Kuwait's placard bore the name Кувейт ("Kuwait") in Kazakh and the name "Athletes from Kuwait" in English. Both announcers called out "Kuwait".
 Indonesia had no athletes competing, rather officials participating.
 Jordan and Lebanon were announced to the crowd and had placard bearers, but were followed by no members of the delegation (including no flag bearer or flag). Jordan's placard bearer marched before Lebanon (after Kyrgyzstan), though the announcers used the correct alphabetical order. Thus no placard bearer came out when Jordan was announced, and both Jordan and Lebanon's placard bearers came out (with some distance in between) when Lebanon was announced.

Cultural Program
Included in the cultural show was the history of Kazakhstan, with a bird’s eye view from an eagle swooping over the vast plains. With dance, song and distinctive musical instruments, the props came to life – notably when water cascaded from the top of the set and lighting transformed the stage into a rough sea to rock the boat looking for new lands.

Also, "The gift packs for the visitors inside the 30,000-seat indoor football stadium included a bag of four snowball-size white sponge balls. Taking their lead from a band of tiny-tot performers dressed as flowers towards the end of the cultural show, the audience opened their packet of “snowballs” and proceeded to pelt anyone and everyone in sight"

Notable songs performed during this program, composed by Igor Krutoy include;

 La fantasia - Nurzhamal Usenbaeva
 My Star (Also known as; New Year) - Roza Rymbayeva and Batyrkhan Shukenov
 Ulisse - Talgat Musabayev (not to be confused with the Kazakh cosmonaut of the same name)
 Always - Lara Fabian

Entry of the Olympic Council of Asia Flag
6 famous athletes and coaches carried the flag. They were:
 Hwan Mai - Coach
 Serik Konakbayev - Former Olympic silver medalist in boxing for the USSR at the 1980 Summer Olympics.
 Kenzhe Sarsekenova - Coach
 Lyudmila Prokasheva - Former Olympic bronze medalist speed skater for Kazakhstan at the 1998 Winter Olympics.
 Vladimir Smirnov - Former multiple Olympic medalist cross-country skier for Kazakhstan and the USSR.
 Aliya Yussupova - Multiple gold medalist rhythmic gymnast at the 2006 Asian Games.

Oaths
The athletes and jury pronounced solemn oaths before the banner of the Olympic Council of Asia.

Opening remarks/Official Opening
The mayor of Astana Imangali Tasmagambetov gave a speech. "The Asiad is being held by Kazakhstan due to the initiative of President Nursultan Nazarbayev. The victory of an athlete is the victory of the country".

This was followed by president of the Olympic council of Asia Ahmed Al-Fahad Al-Ahmed Al-Sabah also giving a welcoming speech. "Kazakhstan is a very respectful member of the international sport community. The Olympic Council of Asia congratulates President Nursultan Nazarbayev, the Government of Kazakhstan, mayors and people of Astana and Almaty".

The games were then officially opened by the president of Kazakhstan, Nursultan Nazarbayev.

Lighting of the Cauldron
The Olympic torch relay, which had criss-crossed the country during January, arrived at its final destination at the Astana Arena, with a group of the country's most decorated sports veterans jointly lighting the Games flame.

This followed by Korean oprea singer Sumi Jo singing "Angels Pass Away".

Finally, another barrage of fireworks that lit up the night sky of the Kazakhstan capital to close the show.

References

2011 Asian Winter Games
Asian Games opening ceremonies
Ceremonies in Kazakhstan